A Touch of the Other is a 1970 British drama film directed by Arnold L. Miller and starring Hélène Françoise, Kenneth Cope and Shirley Anne Field.

Premise
A London private detective finds himself the target of a gangster. Delger, "the man who gets things done", finds himself involved in London's vice world, in between sleeping with his two neighbors Elaine (Shirley Anne Field) and Wendy (Hélène Françoise), a masseuse who "can't give a man a massage without turning him on".

Cast
 Hélène Françoise ...  Wendy
 Kenneth Cope ...  Delger
 Shirley Anne Field ...  Elaine
 Timothy Craven ...  Webber
 Vasco Koulolia ...  Hughes
 Noel Davis ...  Max Ronieau
 Renny Lister ...  Sheila
 Sarah Kemp ...  Shirley (as Gypsie Kemp)
 Paul Stassino ...  Connelly
 Jon Laurimore ...  Det. Sgt. Masterson
 Peter Bland ...  Sgt. Phillips
 Vanda Godsell ...  Angela
 Martin Wyldeck ...  Traylor

References

External links
 

1970 films
British crime drama films
1970 crime drama films
1970s English-language films
1970s British films